Lakes with international borders include

Africa
Lake Abbe  
Lake Albert  
Lake Chad    
Lake Chew Bahir  
Lake Chiuta  
Lake Cohoha  
Lake Edward  
Lake Fianga  
Lake Kariba  
Lake Kivu  
Lake Malawi (Lake Nyasa in Tanzania and Lago Niassa in Mozambique)   
Lake Mweru  
Lake Nasser (Arabic: بحيرة ناصر Boħēret Nāṣer; Sudanese: Lake Nubia)  
Lake Rweru  
Lake Sélingué (artificial lake)  
Lake Tanganyika    
Lake Turkana  
Lake Uniamési (Uniamesi Sea)
Lake Victoria

Americas

North America

Canada / USA
 
Great Lakes watershed: The Canada–United States border runs through all of the Great Lakes except Lake Michigan, and through some other lakes in the watershed of the Saint Lawrence River that connects the Great Lakes to the Atlantic.
 Lake Champlain (French: Lac Champlain; Abenaki: Pitawbagok;) Quebec - Vermont and New York
 Lake Erie Ontario - Michigan, Ohio, Pennsylvania, New York
 Lake Huron Ontario - Michigan
 Lake Memphremagog (French: Lac Memphrémagog) Quebec - Vermont
 Lake Ontario Ontario - New York
 Lake St. Clair Ontario – Michigan 
 Lake Superior (French: lac Supérieur; Ojibwe: ᑭᑦᒉᐁ-ᑲᒣᐁ, romanized: Gitchi-Gami) Ontario - Minnesota, Wisconsin, Michigan
 Other lakes
 Beau Lake Quebec - Maine
 Boundary Lake Manitoba - North Dakota
 Chiputneticook Lakes (consisting of East Grand Lake, North Lake, Mud Lake, Spednic Lake, and Palfrey Lake) New Brunswick - Maine 
 East Grand Lake New Brunswick - Maine 
 Hanging Lake British Columbia - Washington
 Lake Koocanusa (artificial) British Columbia - Montana
 Lake of the Woods Ontario and Manitoba - Minnesota
 Osoyoos Lake British Columbia - Washington
 Rainy Lake Minnesota – Ontario
 Ross Lake British Columbia - Washington
 Saganaga Lake Ontario – Minnesota
 Spednic Lake New Brunswick - Maine
 Waterton Lake Alberta - Montana

Other
Amistad National Recreation Area  
Etang Saumâtre  
Falcon International Reservoir (artificial)  
Lake Güija  
Simpson Bay Lagoon (Saint Martin / Sint Maarten)

South America
Cami Lake  
Cochrane/Pueyrredón Lake  
La Gaiba Lake (Span. Laguna La Gaiba)  
General Carrera Lake (Argentine side: Lake Buenos Aires)  
Mandioré Lake (Spanish: Laguna Mandioré)  
Marfil Lake (Baia Grande)  
Lagoon Mirim  
Mirim Lake  / Lagoon Mirim 
O'Higgins/San Martín Lake  
Lake Parinacota  
Suches Lake or Lago Suches  
Lake Titicaca  
Uberaba Lake  
Vintter Lake or Palena Lake (Arg.: Lago Palena)

Asia 
Ayke  
Aral Sea  
Barun-Torey Lake  
Botkul  
Buir Lake  
Caspian Sea     
Dead Sea  
Heaven Lake (Chosŏn'gŭl: 천지, Ch'ŏnji or Cheonji; Chinese: 天池, Tiānchí; Manchu: Tamun omo or Tamun juce)  
Kartsakhi Lake  (Georgian: კარწახის ტბა, karts'akhis tba), or Lake Khozapini (Georgian: ხოზაფინის ტბა, khozap'inis tba; Turkish: Hazapin Gölü), or Lake Aktaş (Turkish: Aktaş Gölü)  
Lake Khanka (Russian: о́зеро Ха́нка) or Lake Xingkai (simplified Chinese: 兴凯湖; traditional Chinese: 興凱湖; pinyin: Xīngkǎi Hú)  
Pangong Tso or Pangong Lake (Tibetan: སྤང་གོང་མཚོ, Wylie: spang gong mtsho; Hindi: पांगोंग त्सो; Chinese: 班公错; pinyin: Bāngōng Cuò)  
Sabkhat Matti (dry)  
Sarygamysh Lake  
Supung Lake (artificial)  
Tore-Khol Lake  
Uvs Lake  
Zorkul

Europe
Båvrojávrre  
Bilećko Lake  
Lac des Brenets (Swiss name) or Lac de Chaillexon (French name)  
Lake Constance   
Cuciurgan Reservoir (artificial lake)  
Doiran Lake or Doiran Lake (Macedonian: Дојранско Езеро, Dojransko Ezero; Greek: Λίμνη Δοϊράνη, Límni Dhoïráni)  
Lake Drūkšiai or Lake Drysviaty, Lake Drysvyaty, Drisvyaty (Belarusian: Дрысвяты; Russian: Дрисвяты)  
Gaładuś Lake (Lithuanian: Galadusys)  
Gautelisvatnet  
Lake Geneva  
Great St Bernard Lake  
Gresvatnet  
Holderen  
Lake Kilpisjärvi  
Kingen  
Kjårdavatnet  
Klistervatnet  
Langvatnet  
Lago di Lei (artificial lake)  
Leinavatn  
Leirvatnet  
Litlumvatnet  
Lago di Livigno  
Lake Lugano  
Lake Maggiore  
Lough Melvin  
Lac de Moron  
Narva Reservoir (artificial lake)  
Lake Neusiedl (German: Neusiedler See) or Fertő (Hungarian: Fertő tó; Croatian: Nežidersko jezero, Niuzaljsko jezero; Slovene: Nežidersko jezero; Slovak: Neziderské jazero)  
Nowe Warpno Bay (Polish: Zatoka Nowowarpieńska)  
Lake Nuijamaa  
Lake Ohrid  
Onkamojärvi  
Lake Ormož  
Överuman  
Lake Peipus (Estonian: Peipsi-Pihkva järv; Russian: Псковско-Чудское озеро, lit. 'Pskovsko-Chudskoe lake', German: Peipussee)  
Pitelis  
Lake Prespa   
Small Prespa Lake  
Pyhäjärvi  
Rannasee or Rannastausee (artificial)  
Ranseren or Bije-Ransarn (Swedish) or Bijjie Raentsere (Southern Sami)  
Rengen  
Rogen  
Rostojávri  
Siiddašjávri  
Lake Skadar (Montenegrin: Skadarsko jezero, Скадарско језеро; Albanian: Liqeni i Shkodrës) — or Lake Scutari, Lake Shkodër and Lake Shkodra  
Stora Le  
Svanevatn  
Szczecin Lagoon or Stettin Lagoon, Bay of Szczecin, Stettin Bay (Polish: Zalew Szczeciński, German: Stettiner Haff), also Oder lagoon (German: Oderhaff)  
Unna Guovdelisjávri  
Lake Virmayarvi  
Lake Vištytis (Lithuanian: Vištyčio ežeras, German: Wystiter See, Russian: Виштынецкое озеро)  
Vuolep Sårjåsjávrre

See also

List of international river borders
International waters
List of divided islands

External links

International
 !
Lakes